Bollinger Sandstein or Bollingen Sandstone is a sandstone found on Obersee lake shore, namely between Bollingen and Uznach and Buechberg area, in the cantons of St. Gallen and Schwyz in Switzerland.

Geography 

The sandstone is found on Obersee (upper Lake Zürich) northeastern shore, namely between Bollingen and Uznach and on the other side of the lake at the Buechberg area, in the Swiss cantons of St. Gallen and Schwyz.

Description 
Depending on the layer, the appearance and texture of the natural stone also varies, therefore distinct names have developed at the different mining locations: Güntliweid sandstone means a darker, coarse-grained portion of the deposit. The Buechberg variant has a bit brighter colour, while the Uznaberg sandstone is bright and even fine-grained. In addition to these names, the Bollinger-Brand sandstone is mined in Eschenbach SG and the Bollinger-Lehholz sandstone is mined between Jona and Bollingen.

The Bollingen sandstone is lime bound, it contains 30 to 50% quartz grains and 25 to 35% feldspars, 4 to 8% mica and chlorite, and the proportion of binder lime is between 5 and 18%. The color ranges from blue-gray to gray-green, and there are lighter and darker layers.

Related to Swiss sandstone quarries, the occurrence of natural stone is comparatively large, hence, since centuries the sandstone is mined at several locations.

History of purpose 
The present quarry Lehholz mines sandstone in an open-ended cavity. It dates back to 1252 AD when Rudolf II von Rapperswil founded the nearby Wurmsbach Abbey in Jona. For the construction sandstone was used from dedicated quarries, and for centuries high quality "monastic" sandstone was mined. It was transferred with oxen to the lake shore transshipping point to be shipped with so-called Ledi boats towards the present Sechsläutenplatz Zürich far into the 19th century. Particularly the present municipality of Zürich used the Bollingen quarries for the construction of countless public and private buildings, for example, the cathedral towers and the city fortifications, or the Zunfthaus zur Meisen that was built in 1757 with stone from the Buechberg quarry.

The medieval town of Rapperswil, home of the Counts of Rapperswil,  also mined sandstone on the Lützelau island. Presumably Bollinger sandstone is extracted and processed since around 1000 AD, and among others it was also used for the Fraumünster and Grossmünster churches in Zürich, as well as for the Einsiedeln and St. Gallen abbeys.

The Bollingen sandstone is the ideal material for outdoor use and commonly it is still used as cladding for concrete structures, bricks and among others for bridges. Also facades, window and door frames, fountains and grave stones are made from the Bollingen stone. 

In the area between Lehholz and Uznaberg once existed over 100 mining sites which offered for hundred workers jobs in heyday.

See also 
 Bollingen
 Buechberg
 Obersee (Zürichsee)

References

External links 

Mining in Switzerland
Sandstone
Geology of Switzerland
Lake Zurich
Quarries
Geography of the canton of St. Gallen
Geography of the canton of Schwyz
Rapperswil-Jona